Philippe Nicaud (27 June 1926 – 19 April 2009) was a French actor and singer, was married to Christine Carère  from 1957 till her death in 2008. 

Nicaud appeared in the episode "Jet Trail" of the 1966 American television espionage drama series Blue Light.

Partial filmography

 Monelle (1948) - Jules
 To the Eyes of Memory (1948) - Un élève du cours Simon (uncredited)
 Maya (1949) - Albert
 Miquette (1950) - Robert de Flers
 Three Sinners (1950) - José Annequin
 Ballerina (1950) - Loulou
 Les amants de Bras-Mort (1951) - Robert Girard
 Adieu Paris (1952) - Mario
 Operation Magali (1953) - Le guitariste
 Fantaisie d'un jour (1955) - François Chaplar
 Spring, Autumn and Love (1955) - Jean Balestra
 The Maiden (1955) - Philippe-Gérard Maurisset
 Ce soir les jupons volent (1956) - Bernard le costumier sans compagnie
 Printemps à Paris (1957) - Pierre
 Miss Catastrophe (1957) - Le milliardaire Pierre Leroy
 Les 3 font la paire (1957) - Jojo / Teddy / Partner
 Mademoiselle and Her Gang (1957) - Paul
 Mademoiselle Strip-tease (Striptease de Paris) (1957) - Jacques Bersan
  (1958) - Yves Normand
 En légitime défense (1958) - Pierre 'Pierrot' Lambert
 Venetian Honeymoon (1959) - Gérard Chevalier
 Come Dance with Me (1959) - Daniel
 The Gigolo (1960) - Édouard
 Les moutons de Panurge (1961) - Un voisin de table au restaurant (uncredited)
 People in Luck (1963) - Philippe (segment "Le yacht")
 Stranger from Hong-Kong (1963) - L'inspecteur
 Pouic-Pouic (1963) - Simon Guilbaud
 Que personne ne sorte (1964) - L'inspecteur Wens
 The Magnificent Cuckold (1964) - The Doctor
 Désirella (1970) - Philippe de Valmont
 The Lady in the Car with Glasses and a Gun (1970) - Highway Policeman
 La isla misteriosa y el capitán Nemo (1973) - Gédéon Spilett
 Deux grandes filles dans un pyjama (1974) - Jérôme
 Comme une femme (1980) - Jean-Charles
 The Missing Link (1980) - Dragon (French version, voice)
 Le chêne d'Allouville (1981) - Charles Crétois, le député
 Signé Furax (1981) - Le chauffeur du bus détourné
 Tais-toi quand tu parles! (1981) - Jeff
 Chanel Solitaire (1981) - Gabrielle's Father
 Mon Curé Chez les Nudistes (1982) - Léon
 Le corbillard de Jules (1982) - Le lieutenant P.D.
 Plus beau que moi, tu meurs (1982) - Le vicomte
  (1987) - Jacques Offenbach

References

External links
 Philippe Nicaud at IMDB.

1926 births
2009 deaths
French male film actors
People from Courbevoie
French male television actors
20th-century French male singers